This is a list of defunct airlines of Africa.

Algeria

Angola

Benin

Botswana

Burundi

Cape Verde

Cameroon

Central African Republic

Comoros

Congo, Democratic Republic of the

Congo, Republic of

Djibouti

Egypt

Equatorial Guinea

Eritrea

Defunct airlines of Eritrea include;

Eswatini

Gabon

Gambia

Ghana

Guinea

Guinea-Bissau

Ivory Coast

Kenya

Lesotho

Liberia

Libya

Madagascar

Malawi

Mali

Mauritania

Mauritius

Defunct airlines of Mauritius include;

Morocco

Mozambique

Namibia

Nigeria

Réunion
Defunct airlines of Réunion include;

São Tomé and Príncipe

Senegal

Seychelles

Defunct airlines of Seychelles include;

Sierra Leone

Somalia
Defunct airlines of Somalia include;

South Africa

South Sudan

Defunct airlines of South Sudan include;

Sudan

Tanzania

Togo

Tunisia

Uganda

Zambia

Zimbabwe

See also

 List of airlines of Africa
 List of largest airlines in Africa

References

Africa
 Defunct